Skellig Rangers are a Gaelic Athletic Association club from Portmagee, County Kerry. They play in Kerry Intermediate Football Championship, Kerry County League as well as the South Kerry Senior Football Championship and South Kerry Leagues. It was founded in 1895 as Portmagee GAA, and changed to its current name in the 1930s.

Achievements
 South Kerry Senior Football Championships 3: 1946, 1968, 2006
 Kerry Junior Football Championships 1: 2008
 Munster Junior Club Football Championships 1: 2008
 All-Ireland Junior Club Football Championships 1: 2009
 South Kerry Minor Championship: 2022

Notable players
 Stephen O'Sullivan

References

Gaelic games clubs in County Kerry
Gaelic football clubs in County Kerry